Vasily Vasilievich Radlov or Friedrich Wilhelm Radloff (in Berlin – 12 May 1918 in Petrograd) was a German-born Russian founder of Turkology, a scientific study of Turkic peoples. According to Turkologist Johan Vandewalle; he knew all the Turkic languages and dialects as well as German, French, Russian, Greek, Latin, Manchu, Mongolian, Chinese, Arabic, Persian and Hebrew.

Career 
Working as a schoolteacher in Barnaul, Radlov became interested in the native peoples of Siberia and published his ethnographic findings in the influential monograph From Siberia (1884). From 1866 to 1907, he translated and released a number of monuments of Turkic folklore. Most importantly, he was the first to publish the Orhon inscriptions. Four volumes of his comparative dictionary of Turkic languages followed in 1893 to 1911. Radlov helped establish the Russian Museum of Ethnography and was in charge of the Asiatic Museum in St. Petersburg from 1884 to 1894.

Radlov assisted Grigory Potanin on his glossary of Salar language, Western Yugur language, and Eastern Yugur language in Potanin's 1893 Russian language book The Tangut-Tibetan Borderlands of China and Central Mongolia.

During the Stalinist repressions of the late 1930s, the NKVD and state science apparatus accused the late (ethnically German) Radlov of Panturkism. A perceived connection with the long-dead Radlov was treated as incriminating evidence against Orientalists and Turkologists, some of whom were executed, including Alexander Samoylovich in 1938.

Publications
 Radloff W. (1883). Aus Sibirien, Leipzig: T.O. Weigel Aus Siberien : vol.1 Aus Siberien : vol.2
 Atlas der Alterthümer der Mongolei : vol.1 (1892)
W. Radloff. Versuch eines Wörterbuch der Türk-Dialekte.
Band I, 1. 1893
Band I, 2. 1893
Band II, 1. 1899
Band II, 2. 1899
 Radloff W.; trans. (1930). Suvarṇaprabhāsa: aus dem Uigurischen ins Deutsche übersetzt, Leningrad: Akad. Nauk SSSR. 
 Radlov, Vasilij V (1913–1917). Suvarṇaprabhāsa: (sutra zolotogo bleska) ; tekst ujgurskoj redakcij, Sanktpeterburg. Imperatorskaja Akad. Nauk. XV. Reprint, Osnabrück. Biblio-Verlag 1970.
 Aus Sibirien. Lose Blätter aus meinem Tagebuche (1893)
 Tisastvustik; ein in türkischer Sprache bearbeitetes buddhistisches Sutra. I. Transcription und Übersetzung von W. Radloff. II. Bemerkungen zu den Brahmiglossen des Tisastvustik-Manuscripts (Mus. A. Kr. VII) von Baron A. von Stäel-Holstein (1910)

Further reading
 Laut, Jens Peter, Radloff, Friedrich Wilhelm, in: Neue Deutsche Biographie 21 (2003), S. 96–97
 Temir, Ahmet (1955). Leben und Schaffen von Friedrich Wilhelm Radloff (1837–1918): Ein Beitrag zur Geschichte der Türkologie, Oriens 8 (1), 51–93

References

External links
Russian biography
Online conference Radloff 2012
Vasily Radlov's translation of "Kunasi Im Pusar" translated to Turkish

1837 births
1918 deaths
Explorers of Central Asia
Russian orientalists
Linguists from Russia
Russian anthropologists
Full members of the Saint Petersburg Academy of Sciences
Full Members of the Russian Academy of Sciences (1917–1925)
Recipients of the Pour le Mérite (civil class)
German emigrants to the Russian Empire
People from Berlin
Directors of Asiatic Museum
German schoolteachers
Russian Turkologists